Saxon Paige Sharbino  (born June 11, 1999) is an American actress. She is known for portraying Amelia Robbins in the Fox series Touch and Kendra Bowen in the 2015 remake of Poltergeist.

Early life
Sharbino was born in Lewisville, Texas, the daughter of Angela and Ron Sharbino. She began acting at the age of nine. Saxon is the older sister of actress Brighton Sharbino and singer/actor Sawyer Sharbino. Sharbino was homeschooled during her high school years.

Career
Sharbino started acting at nine years old. Her first significant role was in the 2012 TV movie Rogue opposite Angela Bassett.

In 2013, Sharbino worked with Kiefer Sutherland in the TV series Touch. She did not have to audition for the role of Amelia Robbins; the producers simply placed her in the role because she had been previously booked for a Fox pilot that didn't get picked up. She and her family moved to Los Angeles, California for the role and to advance her career. Also in 2013, Sharbino starred with William H. Macy and Amanda Peet in Trust Me as Lydia. Sharbino stated that she learned a lot from director and star Clark Gregg, and the relationship that Macy and his wife Felicity Huffman had inspired her to take a more proactive role in Hollywood. Sharbino stated that she took the role of a young starlet who is manipulated by her father and sexually abused by a talent agent because she wanted to show young actors that Hollywood is not always safe, and that they need to be aware that they are particularly vulnerable in that environment.

In 2015, Sharbino played the teenage daughter Kendra in Poltergeist, a remake of the 1982 horror classic.

In 2016, Sharbino played Simone in the Netflix series Love, and filmed the horror film Bedeviled.

In 2017, Sharbino was in the Hulu action horror series Freakish. Sharbino stated that she was drawn to the role of Anka, a manipulative "mean girl" with a soft side.

Sharbino played high school student Sarah Pearson in American Vandal, which was released in 2017.

In 2018, Sharbino starred with her younger sister Brighton, in the movie Urban Country.

In 2019, Sharbino starred in Beyond the Law alongside Steven Seagal.

In 2020, Sharbino started regularly posting to her YouTube channel, which often features her brother and sister.

Personal life 
Sharbino dated boxer/YouTube star Jake Paul in 2014 and started dating actor Pierson Fodé in 2020.

Filmography

Film

Television

References

External links
 
 

1999 births
21st-century American actresses
American television actresses
Actresses from Texas
American film actresses
American child actresses
Living people
People from Lewisville, Texas